Inayatullah Khan was an Indian politician from the state of the Madhya Pradesh.
He represented Sehore Vidhan Sabha constituency in Madhya Pradesh Legislative Assembly by winning General election of 1957.

References 

Year of birth missing
Year of death missing
Madhya Pradesh MLAs 1957–1962
People from Sehore
Indian National Congress politicians from Madhya Pradesh